Priest River is a city in Bonner County, Idaho. The population was 1,751 at the 2010 census. Located in the Idaho Panhandle region of the state, the city is at the mouth of the Priest River on the Pend Oreille River.

Geography

Priest River is located on the west bank of the Priest River, which drains Priest Lake 68 miles to the north, where the Priest River joins the much larger Pend Oreille River on its north bank. U.S. Route 2 passes through the town from Sandpoint on the east to Newport and the state of Washington on the west.

Highways
  - US 2 - to Sandpoint (northeast) and Spokane, Washington (southwest)
  - SH-57 - to Priest Lake (north)

Demographics

2010 census
As of the census of 2010, there were 1,751 people, 713 households, and 474 families living in the city. The racial makeup of the city was 93.3% White, 0.1% African American, 1.1% Native American, 0.6% Asian, 0.2% Pacific Islander, 0.8% from other races, and 3.9% from two or more races. Hispanic or Latino of any race were 2.1% of the population.

There were 713 households, of which 34.5% had children under the age of 18 living with them, 44.5% were married couples living together, 12.2% had a female householder with no husband present, 9.8% had a male householder with no wife present, and 33.5% were non-families. 28.1% of all households were made up of individuals, and 12.7% had someone living alone who was 65 years of age or older. The average household size was 2.45 and the average family size was 2.98.

The median age in the city was 38.1 years. 26.7% of residents were under the age of 18; 8.6% were between the ages of 18 and 24; 23.5% were from 25 to 44; 25.5% were from 45 to 64; and 15.8% were 65 years of age or older. The gender makeup of the city was 49.2% male and 50.8% female.

2000 census
As of the census of 2000, there were 1,754 people, 692 households, and 469 families living in the city. The racial makeup of the city was 94.70% White, 1.43% Native American, 0.46% Asian, 0.51% from other races, and 2.91% from two or more races. Hispanic or Latino of any race were 1.60% of the population.

There were 692 households, out of which 35.1% had children under the age of 18 living with them, 54.9% were married couples living together, 9.1% had a female householder with no husband present, and 32.2% were non-families. 26.6% of all households were made up of individuals, and 12.4% had someone living alone who was 65 years of age or older. The average household size was 2.53 and the average family size was 3.09.

In the city, the population was spread out, with 28.9% under the age of 18, 8.4% from 18 to 24, 26.6% from 25 to 44, 21.9% from 45 to 64, and 14.1% who were 65 years of age or older. The median age was 35 years. For every 100 females, there were 96.0 males. For every 100 females age 18 and over, there were 93.3 males.

The median income for a household in the city was $26,765, and the median income for a family was $32,198. Males had a median income of $30,607 versus $16,034 for females. The per capita income for the city was $14,125. About 14.0% of families and 18.9% of the population were below the poverty line, including 27.7% of those under age 18 and 9.7% of those age 65 or over.

See also
 List of cities in Idaho
 Priest River Lamanna High School

References

External links

 
 Chamber of Commerce - Priest River, Idaho
 West Bonner School District #83 - public schools
 Sandpoint.com - Priest River, Idaho
 Priest River Development Corp.
 Priest River Idaho.com - blog
 AirNav.com - airport - Priest River, Idaho

Cities in Bonner County, Idaho
Cities in Idaho